Alina Tsviliy (Ukrainian: Аліна Цвілій; born 18 September 1994) is a Ukrainian race walker.

Career 
In 2018 she won silver medal at the 2018 European Athletics Championships and set a new national record at the championships. But she was later disqualified for the period from 2 August 2018 until 3 May 2021.

She studied at the State Pedagogical University in Pereiaslav.

Achievements

References

External links
 

1994 births
Living people
Ukrainian female racewalkers
Doping cases in athletics